Karabük Province is a landlocked province in the northern part of Anatolia (northern central Turkey), located about  north of Ankara,  away from Zonguldak and  away from Kastamonu. In 2010 it had a population of 227,610.

Karabük Province is one of the newest provinces of Turkey. Until 1995 it was a district of Zonguldak, when it became an il (provincial center) in its own right. Established in 1995, it comprises Karabük, Eflani, Safranbolu and Yenice districts which were formerly part of Zonguldak Province and Eskipazar and Ovacık districts which were previously part of Çankırı Province.

Karabük is located on the highway between Bartın and Ankara, which was in ancient times an important route between Amasra on the coast and central Anatolia. The railway between Ankara and Zonguldak passes through Karabük.

Safranbolu, a historically important city, which is listed in the UNESCO World Heritage List, is located in Karabük Province.

Districts 

Karabük province is divided into 6 districts (capital district in bold):
 Eflani
 Eskipazar
 Karabük
 Ovacık
 Safranbolu
 Yenice

History 

Karabük received its name from its geography. Its name occurred from combine of Kara, black in English, and Bük, shrubbery in English.

Although there are many tumuli and hill towns which give information of history of the region before the invention of writing, due to absence of scientific analysis, there is not sufficient information. However, as to archeological researches which were done around Eskipazar and Ovacık,  the earliest site in this region is Yazıboy, which is a village of Eskipazar nowadays.  Researches think that one of tumulus in this village reach today from b.c. 2500.

Gallery

See also
List of populated places in Karabük Province

References

External links 

  Karabük governor's official website
  Karabük municipality's official website
  Karabük weather forecast information
 Karabük Guide
  Eflani News
  Karabük News Website

 
States and territories established in 1995
1995 establishments in Turkey